Rearview Town is the eighth studio album by American country music singer Jason Aldean. It was released on April 13, 2018 via Broken Bow Records. It debuted at the top of the Billboard 200 chart, becoming Aldean's fourth consecutive number one album in the United States.

Content
As with all of Aldean's previous albums, Rearview Town was released on Broken Bow Records, with Michael Knox serving as producer. The lead single is "You Make It Easy", a song that was co-written by both members of Florida Georgia Line. The album includes a total of 15 songs, including a duet with Miranda Lambert. An article in Rolling Stone Country stated that the album's title track "hits on the theme of leaving the past behind and moving forward to something better."

Commercial performance
"Rearview Town" debuted at number one on the Billboard 200 chart, making it his fourth consecutive studio album to do so. This also makes him only the second country music act after Rascal Flatts to have four consecutive albums debut at the top of that chart. It shifted 183,000 equivalent album units, of which 162,000 were in traditional album sales. It also debuted atop the Top Country Albums chart. It was the fifth best-selling album in the United States with 463,000 copies sold. The album was certified Gold by the RIAA on August 8, 2018. It has sold 500,700 copies in the United States as of October 2019, and 1.32 million equivalent album units as of February 2020.

Track listing

Personnel
Adapted from AllMusic

Jason Aldean - lead vocals, background vocals
Kurt Allison - electric guitar
Blake Bollinger - drum programming
Jaren Boyer - drum programming
Perry Coleman - background vocals
Kyle Fishman - drum programming
Tony Harrell - Hammond B-3 organ, keyboards, strings, synthesizer
Mike Johnson - steel guitar
Tully Kennedy - bass guitar
Michael Knox - drum programming
Miranda Lambert - featured vocals on "Drowns the Whiskey"
Miles McPherson - drum programming
Josh Mirenda - background vocals
Russ Pahl - steel guitar
Danny Rader - bouzouki, acoustic guitar, tres
Rich Redmond - drums, percussion
Jerry Roe - drum programming
Jordan Schmidt - drum programming
Adam Shoenfeld - e-bow, electric slide guitar, electric guitar, talk box
Jody Stevens - drum programming
Neil Thrasher - background vocals
Patrick Thrasher - drum programming
Michael Tyler - background vocals

Charts

Weekly charts

Year-end charts

Decade-end charts

Singles

Certifications

References

2018 albums
Jason Aldean albums
BBR Music Group albums
Albums produced by Michael Knox (record producer)